The house swift (Apus nipalensis) is a species of swift in the family Apodidae. It is found in Japan, Nepal, and Southeast Asia. It is capable of flying long distances by alternately shutting off hemispheres of their brain in-flight. In May 2012, one was discovered in Ladner, British Columbia, the first known sighting in North America.

It was formerly considered a subspecies of the little swift.

References

External links
 BirdLife Species Factsheet
 Bird Research - House Swift

house swift
Birds of Nepal
Birds of Eastern Himalaya
Birds of South China
Birds of Taiwan
Birds of Korea
Birds of Japan
Birds of Southeast Asia
house swift